Gooise Meren is a municipality in the province of North Holland, the Netherlands.

Gooise Meren has existed since 2016. It is a merger of the former municipalities of Bussum, Muiden, Muiderberg and Naarden. Eastern (Naarden area) and southern part (Bussum area) of the municipality lie within the Gooi region, western part (Muiden area) lies within the Vechtstreek region.

The very northern part of the Utrecht Hill Ridge, lake Naardermeer and artificial island Pampus are situated within its boundaries.

Gooise Meren borders in the northwest on lake IJmeer, in the northeast on lake Gooimeer. The Vecht river empties into the IJmeer at Muiden, and also the northern end of the former Hollandic Water Line ends in Muiden.

Politics 
The municipal council consists of 31 seats, which are divided as follows:
 VVD - 8 seats
 CDA - 5 seats
 D66 - 5 seats
 PvdA - 4 seats
 GroenLinks - 3 seats
 50PLUS - 2 seats
 Hart voor Bussum - 2 seats
 Gooise Ouderen Partij - 2 seats

The municipal executive consists of a mayor (Han ter Heegde, VVD) and five aldermen (2 VVD, 1 CDA, 1 D66, 1 GroenLinks).

Notable people 

 Willem Cornelisz van Muyden (1573 in Muiden – 1634) a ship's carpenter and mariner
 Salomon van Ruysdael (ca.1602 in Naarden – 1670) a Dutch Golden Age landscape painter
 Jan van Neck (1634–1714) a Dutch Golden Age painter
 Moses Lemans (1785 in Naarden - 1832) a Dutch-Jewish Hebraist and mathematician and a leader of the Haskalah movement in Holland
 Pieter Merkus (1787 in Naarden – 1844) Governor-General of the Dutch East Indies 1841/1844
 Willem Cornelis Bauer (1862 - 1904 in Bussum) a Dutch architect and painter
 Frederik van Eeden (1860 – 1932 in Bussum) a Dutch writer and psychiatrist
 Abraham Samson Onderwijzer (1862 in Muiden - 1934) a Dutch rabbi
 Frank Martin (1890 – 1974 in Naarden) a Swiss composer
 Willem Arondeus (1894 in Naarden – 1943) an artist and author who joined the Dutch resistance
 Gerrit Jan van Heuven Goedhart (1901 in Bussum – 1956) a Dutch politician and diplomat, first United Nations High Commissioner for Refugees 1951/1956
 Freddy Wittop (1911 in Bussum – 2001) a costume designer, dancer and college professor 
 Wim van Norden (1917 in Bussum – 2015) a Dutch journalist, co-founder of Het Parool
 Paul Biegel (1925 in Bussum – 2006) a prolific Dutch writer of children's literature
 Willem Duys (1928 in Bussum – 2011) a radio and TV presenter, tennis player and music producer, lived in Naarden
 Virginie Korte-van Hemel (1929 in Bussum – 2014) a Dutch politician and jurist
 Job de Ruiter (1930 – 2015 in Naarden) a Dutch politician, diplomat and jurist
 Ronnie Tober (born 1945 in Bussum) a Dutch singer 
 Tessa de Loo (born 1946 in Bussum) pen name of the Dutch novelist and short story writer
 Marjan Unger (1946 in Bussum – 2018) a Dutch art historian, wrote the standard work on Dutch jewellery
 André Knevel (born 1950 in Bussum) a Canadian concert organist, arranger and accompanist
 René Bernards (born 1953 in Bussum) a Dutch cancer researcher and academic
 Ernst Reijseger (born 1954 in Bussum) a Dutch cellist and composer, with jazz and contemporary classical music
 Youp van 't Hek (born 1954 in Naarden) a Dutch comedian, author and singer-songwriter  
 Arthur Arnold (born 1967 in Naarden) a Dutch orchestra conductor. 
 Thekla Reuten (born 1975 in Bussum) a Dutch actress 
 Josylvio (born 1992 in Naarden) a Dutch hip hop rapper
 Egbert Haverkamp-Begemann (1923 in Naarden – 2017), Dutch American art historian

Sport 

 Tineke Lagerberg (born 1941 in Bussum) a retired Dutch swimmer, team bronze medallist at the 1960 Summer Olympics
 Huub Rothengatter (born 1954 in Bussum) a former racing driver
 Anneloes Nieuwenhuizen (born 1963 in Bussum) a former Dutch field hockey defender, team gold medallist at the 1984 Summer Olympics
 Ruud Hesp (born 1965 in Bussum) a Dutch former professional football goalkeeper with 504 club caps
 twins Tim & Tom Coronel (born 1972 in Naarden) Dutch racing drivers 
 Wouter Jolie (born 1985 in Naarden) a Dutch field hockey player, team silver medallist at the 2012 Summer Olympics
 Lucas Steijn (born 1986 in Muiderberg) a Dutch former basketball player
 Marlous Pieëte (born 1989 in Naarden) a Dutch female retired international footballer with 51 caps for the NL
 Ferry Weertman (born 1992 in Naarden) a Dutch long-distance freestyle swimmer, gold medalist at the 2016 Summer Olympics  
 Robin van Kampen (born 1994) a Dutch chess grandmaster, brought up in Bussum
Youri Mulder (born in 1969) a retired Dutch Footballer
Joël Drommel (born 1996), football goalkeeper

References

External links 

  Official website Gooise Meren

 
Municipalities of North Holland
Municipalities of the Netherlands established in 2016